A total of 15 nations competed in the women's team event at the 1988 Summer Olympics as part of the archery programme. The ranking round score for a team was the sum of the three scores earned by the individual archers in the individual ranking round. The top twelve nations competed in the semifinals, with the top eight advancing to the finals.

Summary
Preliminary round
The ranking round score for a team was the sum of the three scores earned by the individual archers in the individual ranking round. The top twelve nations competed in the semifinals, with the top eight moving on to the final.

Semifinal
In the women's team semifinals, Korea kept a firm grip on the lead.  The Chinese Taipei team plummeted eight places to eleventh, joining Mongolia, China, and Poland in not advancing to the finals.  The Soviets dropped a place but still looked strong even as the Americans passed them and the Indonesian and British teams grew nearer.

Final
A tie for the silver medal between Indonesia and the United States was resolved using a nine arrow tie-breaker.  The Indonesian women shot a 72, while the Americans shot a 67. 15-year-old American Denise Parker become the youngest medalist in the history of Olympic archery. This was also the first medal, in any sport, the Indonesians had won at the Olympics. The Soviets were behind both teams by only 1 point, while the Koreans won easily by a margin of 30 points.

Result

References

External links
Official Olympic Report

Archery at the 1988 Summer Olympics
1988 in women's archery
Women's events at the 1988 Summer Olympics